French Lake may refer to:

French Lake, California
French Lake, a lake in Dayton, Hennepin County, Minnesota
French Lake, a lake in McLeod County, Minnesota
French Lake, a lake in Rice County, Minnesota
French Lake (Wright County, Minnesota)
 French Lake in Mineral County, Montana